Dhana Pishachi is a 1967 Indian Kannada-language film directed and produced by S. N. Singh. The film stars Sampath, K. S. Ashwath, Dikki Madhavarao and Kalpana. The film has musical score by Chellapilla Satyam.

Cast

References

External links
 
 

1967 films
1960s Kannada-language films